Lively Laddie is the name of a donkey who lived for many years. Born in 1943, he was hired for recreational rides at Blackpool Pleasure Beach, a family owned amusement park in Blackpool, England, for many years before being adopted by the Konig family in 1988.

At one time, Lively Laddie was ridden by Bob Champion MBE, winner of the 1981 Grand National, before Champion became a success.

He subsequently lived with the Konig family on Guernsey and moved with them to Sark in 1997. In 2003, when he was 60, Susie Konig attempted to have recognition for Lively Laddie as the "oldest living donkey". The donkey was in good health until at least the age of 60.

Lively Laddie died in 2005 at the age of 62.

References 

Individual donkeys
Individual animals in England
Blackpool Pleasure Beach